Majestic Wine  is Great Britain’s largest specialist retailer of wine. The company employs over 1,400 staff nationwide, and operates more than 200 stores in the United Kingdom. The business is headquartered in Watford and has a distribution centre in Hemel Hempstead.

History

1980 to 1999

Majestic Vintners was founded by Sheldon Graner in 1980. Prior to Majestic Vintners, Graner gained worked as a merchandiser with the John Lewis group. The initial design logo for the company was based on a definitive set of King George V postage stamps of 1929. During the 1970s, laws regarding selling alcohol were restrictive in the United Kingdom. Majestic Vinters offered wine tastings and sold wine by the case to comply with the laws.

Graner opened his first wine warehouse in Harringay, North London, in 1980, under the management of Tony Mason, brought in by Graner to manage the day-to-day activities. The second store was opened in Battersea in May 1981. In the middle of 1981, the group called in receivers. Majestic's assets were bought from the receivers by Giles Clarke.

In August 1987, Majestic acquired Liquor Barn, a chain of 104 stores in California and Arizona. Following the disposal of the American business, Majestic Wine was sold for £15 million to investors in 1989.

In 1986, Tony Mason set up Wizard Wine under the same concept, which in 1987 was purchased by retailer Bejam. After Bejam was purchased by rival Iceland in January 1989, Mason and partners John Apthorp (now retired) and Tim How (CEO until 2008) bought Wizard Wine from the heavily indebted Iceland. In September 1991, Wizard Wine purchased Majestic Wine PLC in a leveraged buyout, and merged under the Majestic Wine Warehouses brand as a private company. Headquartered in Watford, Hertfordshire, under the leadership of Tim How (CEO until 2008), Majestic Wine became a public company in 1996, floating on the Alternative Investment Market (AIM).

2000 to 2019
 April 2000 – Majestic.co.uk launched, offering customers an online service.
 October 2001 – Majestic acquired Les Celliers de Calais, whose business was based around the British cross-channel trade. Rebranded initially as Wine & Beer World, and since 2013 as Majestic Wine Calais, there are now two stores in Calais and Coquelles following the closures of branches in Le Havre and Cherbourg.
 July 2003 – Majestic opened their first temperature-controlled fine wine centre at St. John's Wood store.
 October 2005 – Majestic launched Gift Solutions, an online service designed to allow customers to send gifts of less than twelve bottles. The company's 13th consecutive annual rise in turnover was recorded, with profits of £13.2m.
 March 2009 – Majestic acquired the privately owned companies: Lay & Wheeler Ltd, WBI Ltd and Vinotheque Holdings Ltd as the fine wine specialist arm of Majestic Wine plc.
 June 2009 – Majestic published company report stating that the administrative costs had increased by £6 million from £10 million, head office staffing increased by 10%. Store staffing increased by a little over 1%. The increase in store numbers means that the store staffing increase is actually a real terms decrease.
 September 2009 – Majestic reduced its in store minimum purchase from twelve bottles to six bottles.
 June 2012 – Majestic reduced the minimum purchase for online orders and deliveries from twelve to six bottles.
 February 2015 – Majestic announced the departure of chief executive Steve Lewis.
 April 2015 – Majestic acquired Naked Wines for up to £70 million, and appointed Naked's founder Rowan Gormley as chief executive.

By 2016, Majestic Wine had 211 stores in the United Kingdom.

In June 2016, Majestic Wine announced a double digit sales boost since the purchase of Naked Wines. 

In 2019, Majestic announced that the business would be restructured. The 'Majestic' business, including the 200 stores, brand, Calais and on-trade arms, was sold to private equity firm Fortress Investment Group for £95m. Fortress re-hired John Colley as Chief Executive. Majestic Wines PLC was renamed to Naked Wines. Effectively, the previous shareholders of Majestic became shareholders of Naked Wines, and the Majestic business gained new shareholders.

2020 to present

May 2020 – Majestic Wine extended its relationship with Deliveroo in the United Kingdom, in order to better reach customers staying at home because of the COVID-19 pandemic.
June 2020 - Majestic Wine hired a performance marketing agency, Journey Further to help improve online and offline revenues.

Today, Majestic Wine operates as a wine retailer, selling a mixture of wine, champagne, beers and spirits. Majestic's stores offer customers free wine tasting, free delivery and free glass hire.

References

External links

Lay & Wheeler website
Vinotheque website
Naked Wines website

Retail companies of the United Kingdom
Retail companies established in 1980
Companies based in Watford
Wine retailers
1980 establishments in the United Kingdom
Wine retailers of the United Kingdom
Drink companies of the United Kingdom